La Última Vuelta World Tour was the eighth and farewell concert tour by Puerto Rican rapper and singer Daddy Yankee, in support of his seventh and final studio album Legendaddy (2022). Comprising 89 shows, the tour began on July 16, 2022 in Torremolinos, Spain and concluded on January 8, 2023 in San Juan, Puerto Rico. It visited North America twice while making a one-month-lasting stop in South America, as well as a single European show in Spain as part of a music festival. The January 6, 2023 show in Puerto Rico commemorated 30 years of a shooting incident that occurred on January 6, 1993, which allowed Daddy Yankee to focus entirely on his music career due to a bullet wound that ended his dream of becoming a professional baseball player.

The rapper announced that he plans to retire from music after the end of the tour in order to enjoy what he had achieved during his career. Before the beginning of the tour, he matched the record for the most consecutive shows at the Foro Sol in Mexico and became the first artist to sell out three shows in a single day at the Estadio Nacional in Chile. It was nominated for a Pollstar Award for Latin Tour of the Year. By its conclusion, La Última Vuelta became Daddy Yankee's most successful tour, the sixth highest-grossing tour worldwide of 2022 and the second highest-grossing Latin tour in Boxscore history, with a total gross of 198.1 million dollars in ticket sales and 1.9 million attendees.

Background
At the 28th Billboard Latin Music Awards on September 23, 2021, during Daddy Yankee's acceptance speech for his induction into the Billboard Latin Music Hall of Fame, he hinted at a retirement by saying to his fans to "enjoy his last musical round". On December 30, 2021, he confirmed that in 2022 he would "give his last round to the world". On March 20, 2022,  after a 32-year career, Daddy Yankee announced his retirement from music after the end of his farewell concert tour, La Última Vuelta World Tour, as well as the release date for his final album, Legendaddy. Daddy Yankee decided to retire while working on the record and after feeling that the time had come to "look for something beyond the industry" and to "give himself the opportunity to enjoy everything he had achieved" during his career. He had previously stated on September 15, 2021 that he saw himself growing as an executive producer of movies and documentaries.

Stage design
The three-floor stage of the concerts is composed of two big vertical screens and an horizontal one of 3,600 square feet (334 square meters), five live cameras, nine fire spraying machines, 20 circular LED reflectors by side, three-dimensional effects, pyrotechnics and 180 laser beams. Daddy Yankee performed alongside a live band of nine musicians, two backing vocalists and 16 dancers. Guest features Bad Bunny, Rauw Alejandro, Luis Fonsi, Lil Jon, Pitbull, Ozuna, Myke Towers, Wisin & Yandel and Zion & Lennox appeared through pre-recorded footage on a holographic screen, which was also used to display "a life-size gold airplane" at the start of the shows, of which Daddy Yankee emerged from.

Ticketing and itinerary

The initial dates were announced on March 20, 2022, with the tour scheduled to start on August 10, 2022 in Portland, Oregon and to end on December 2, 2022 in Mexico City, with a total of 41 shows. However, more dates were added, setting the tour's beginning on July 15, 2022 in Madrid, Spain and its conclusion on January 8, 2023 in San Juan, Puerto Rico, increasing its number of shows to 91. The tour's scheduled first date in Madrid, part of the Madrid Puro Reggaetón Festival at the Metropolitano Stadium, was cancelled at the last minute due to a breach of contract and security measures that did not meet the necessary requirements.

La Última Vuelta began in Torremolinos, Spain on July 16, part of the Puro Latino Fest, as the only show in Europe. The tour continued in the United States from July 25 in Denver to September 20 in New York City, with four stops between Rosarito, Mexico and the Canadian cities of Montreal and Toronto. It carried on in Latin America from September 23 in Santa Cruz de la Sierra, Bolivia through December 4 in Mexico City before returning to the United States on December 6 in Charlotte and giving the tour's last show of 2022 on December 22 in Miami. It continued in San Juan, Puerto Rico with three dates from January 6 to the tour's conclusion on January 8, 2023 at the Hiram Bithorn Stadium, ballpark of baseball team Cangrejeros de Santurce, of which Daddy Yankee is co-owner, shareholder and vice president of operations. The January 6, 2023 show commemorated 30 years of a shooting incident occurred on January 6, 1993, which frustrated Daddy Yankee's dream of becoming a professional baseball player due to a bullet wound on his leg but that allowed him to focus entirely on his music career.

Setlist
The following setlist performed was at the July 28, 2022 concert held at Kia Forum in Inglewood, California and does not represent all shows throughout the tour.

 "Campeón"
 "Remix"
 "Problema"
 "Rompe"
 "Machucando"
 "Lo Que Pasó, Pasó"
 "Rumbatón"
 "Ella Me Levantó"
 "Mayor Que Yo"
 "No Me Dejes Solo"
 "Tu Príncipe"
 "Yo Voy"
 "Shaky Shaky"
 "Baila Baila Baila" (Remix version)
 "China"
 "Pasatiempo"
Encore:
 "Somos de Calle"
 "Enchuletiao'"
 "La Santa"
 "X Última Vez"
 "Agua"
 Playero – "Que Tire Pa' Lante"
 "Despacito"
 "La Despedida"
 "¿Qué Tengo Que Hacer?"
 "Hot"
 "Limbo"
 "Bombón"
 "Con Calma"
 "Dura"
 "Gasolina"

Reception

Critical response
Remezcla's Alexis Hodoyán-Gastélum described the first of five shows in Los Angeles as "two hours of an epic non-stop dancing party" and "a trip down memory lane," as well as "a huge flex on having a career filled with hit after hit after hit, a sonic legacy that will live on for generations." She noticed nostalgia to be "a big component throughout the show," in which songs like "Rompe" (2005) and "Ella Me Levantó" (2007) "drew the best reactions from the crowd," as well as "more mainstream" singles including "Limbo" (2012) and "Con Calma" (2019). Billboards Griselda Flores referred to the second concert at Kia Forum as a "high-tech, riveting show" with an "impressive production". It was nominated for a Pollstar Award for Latin Tour of the Year at the 34th Pollstar Awards.

Commercial performance
La Última Vuelta World Tour was the sixth highest-grossing tour of 2022, with earnings of over 197 million dollars for the year's 83 shows and around 1.9 million ticket sales. It became Daddy Yankee's most successful concert tour of his career and the second highest-grossing Latin tour in Boxscore history, behind Bad Bunny's World's Hottest Tour. It was the second highest-grossing tour of the year in Latin America, with a gross of 112.7 million dollars, and the 21st in North America, with 65 million dollars. His five concerts at the Foro Sol in Mexico matched local band Grupo Firme's record for the most consecutive shows at the venue. Chilean concert production company Bizarro Live Entertainment reported that he became the first artist to sell out three shows in a single day at the Estadio Nacional Julio Martínez Prádanos in Chile after doing so in five hours.

Tour dates

Cancelled shows

Notes

References

2022 concert tours
Concert tours of North America
Concert tours of South America